The Alexander Hills are a mountain range in the Mojave Desert near Death Valley, in northern San Bernardino County, California.

References 

Mountain ranges of the Mojave Desert
Mountain ranges of Southern California
Mountain ranges of San Bernardino County, California